Ranson is a surname, and may refer to:

 Arthur Ranson (born 1939), English comic book illustrator 
 Jack Ranson (1909–1992), English footballer
 J. B. Ranson (1864–?), commander of White Star Line liners
 J. M. Ranson (born 1938), English rugby union player
 C. Kyle Ranson, President and CEO of InFocus 
 Paul Ranson (1864–1909), French painter and writer
 Ray Ranson (born 1960), English entrepreneur and former footballer 
 Thomas R. Ranson, Confederate Army officer
 Trevor Ranson (1912-1996), Australian rules footballer

See also 
 Ranson, West Virginia, an American city